is a former Japanese football player and manager. He played for Japan national team.

Club career
Nimura was born in Kyoto on May 2, 1943. After graduating from Waseda University, he joined Toyo Industries in 1966. The club won Japan Soccer League champions 4 times (1966, 1967, 1968, 1970) and Emperor's Cup 2 times (1967, 1969). This was the greatest era in Toyo Industries history. He retired in 1976. He played 151 games and scored 16 goals in the league.

National team career
In December 1970, Nimura was selected Japan national team for 1970 Asian Games. At this competition, on December 10, he debuted against Malaysia. He played 5 games for Japan in 1970.

Coaching career
After retirement, Nimura became a manager for Mazda (former Toyo Industries) as Aritatsu Ogi successor in 1981. However, in 1983 season, the club finished at the bottom place and was relegated to Division 2 first time. He resigned end of 1983 season.

National team statistics

References

External links
 
 Japan National Football Team Database

1943 births
Living people
Waseda University alumni
Association football people from Kyoto Prefecture
Japanese footballers
Japan international footballers
Japan Soccer League players
Sanfrecce Hiroshima players
Footballers at the 1970 Asian Games
Japanese football managers
Association football midfielders
Asian Games competitors for Japan